Elina: As If I Wasn't There is a 2002 film directed by Klaus Härö and based on a novel by Kerstin Johansson i Backe.

Plot
In the 1950s, nine-year-old Elina lives with her younger siblings and her mother in the Torne Valley in the north of Sweden, near the Finnish border. Her father, whom she loved dearly, died of tuberculosis a few years ago. Elina finds consolation in wandering out on the dangerous marshlands to have imaginary conversations with her dead father. Elina also contracted tuberculosis, but recovered. Because she was ill for so long, Elina is obliged to repeat a whole year at school. However, since she missed so much schooling as a result, she has been put in a new class with a different teacher, the strict Tora Holm. Tora Holm sees it as her mission to protect her pitiable charges from the pitfalls of life, believing that only those who speak perfect Swedish have any chance of a happy and successful life. Elina's family belongs to a Finnish-speaking minority frowned upon by a staunch schoolmistress who starts hounding Elina for speaking Finnish in class and questioning her authority. Elina's mother, sister, and a liberal young male teacher all try to mediate the ensuing battle of wills between Elina and Miss Holm. Especially when Elina exercises the sense of justice she learned from her father and stands up for one of her schoolmates. Although nobody is willing to take her side, little Elina proves far stronger than teacher Tora Holm reckoned. The conflict comes to a head when Elina flees to the dangerous moor.

Cast

References

External links
 
 Rediscovering Norway

2002 films
Films directed by Klaus Härö
Swedish drama films
2002 multilingual films
Swedish multilingual films
Finnish multilingual films
2000s Swedish films